First Edition is the first album by the New Zealand hip-hop artist, Dei Hamo released in 2005. The album charted at #13 on the New Zealand Albums Chart.

Track listing 
"Intro"
"To Tha Floor"
"Make It Hot"
"Explode", featuring Crystal
"This Is My Life", featuring Chong Nee
"Do Work"
"Whateva"
"Hot Girl 05"
"We Gon' Ride"
"The Kissing Game", featuring Crystal
"Home Invasion", featuring Boh Runga
"In the Name"
"Pillow Talk"
"Cry Again", featuring Tim Finn
"A True Story"
"Outro"
"Hot Girl" (Bonus Track)

References 

2005 albums
Dei Hamo albums